Jordan Nicholson (born 29 September 1993) is an English professional footballer who plays as an attacking midfielder for  club Peterborough Sports. He previously played in the Football League for Peterborough United and Barnet and in non-league football for several clubs.

Playing career
Nicholson began his career as a youth- and reserve-team player for Cambridge City, and made one brief substitute appearance for their Southern League team in April 2013 before leaving the club at the end of the season. He spent 2013–14 scoring freely in Cambridgeshire County League football for Sawston United, before an equally successful, albeit injury-afflicted, 2014–15 season in the United Counties League with Eynesbury Rovers. He joined Histon of the Southern League Premier Division in the summer of 2015, and scored 15 goals in the space of four months.

After a trial, Nicholson signed a two-and-a-half-year contract with League One club Peterborough United on 24 December 2015, at which point he gave up his former job as a carer. He made his Football League debut on 20 February 2016, coming on as a half-time substitute for Harry Toffolo in a 3–0 defeat to Millwall at The Den.

He was loaned to National League North club Nuneaton Town on 4 August 2016 for the season, but was recalled in March 2017 because his parent club wanted to assess him. Nicholson joined Nuneaton on loan again for the 2017–18 season. On 31 January 2018, he was recalled and joined League Two club Barnet permanently. He returned to the National League North in March, on loan to Brackley Town for what remained of the season. Nicholson was released by Barnet at the end of the season.

Nicholson followed his former manager at Nuneaton, Tommy Wright, to another National North club, Darlington, in June 2018. He finished the season as top scorer, with 11 goals from 43 appearances, and was then released by mutual consent.

He signed for Hereford, also of the National League North, in June 2019. In January 2020, Nicholson joined Buxton on loan. On 13 March 2020, he joined Boston United on loan until the end of the season. Following the curtailment of the season due to the coronavirus pandemic, Nicholson did not make his debut until 25 July 2020 in the playoff semi-final win against Gateshead. His second and last appearance was in the final, which Boston lost to Altrincham.

After Nicholson left Hereford, Boston had hoped to make his move permanent, but instead he signed for Southern League Premier Division Central club Peterborough Sports. The 2020–21 season was curtailed with very few matches played, and Nicholson became a first-team regular in 2021–22 before a broken leg put him out for four months. He returned to action with three matches left in the regular season, and was able to start both play-off matches as Peterborough Sports gained promotion to the National League North. On 21 September 2022, 16 minutes after scoring what proved to be the only goal of an FA Cup replay, Nicholson broke the same leg.

Career statistics

References

External links

1993 births
Living people
People from Godmanchester
English footballers
Association football forwards
Cambridge City F.C. players
Sawston United F.C. players
Eynesbury Rovers F.C. players
Histon F.C. players
Peterborough United F.C. players
Nuneaton Borough F.C. players
Barnet F.C. players
Brackley Town F.C. players
Darlington F.C. players
Hereford F.C. players
Buxton F.C. players
Boston United F.C. players
Peterborough Sports F.C. players
Southern Football League players
English Football League players
National League (English football) players
Northern Premier League players